Orlando City B (or OCB for short) is an American soccer club that began play in 2016 and currently plays in MLS Next Pro. Owned by Orlando City SC and based at the Orlando City training facility in Kissimmee, the club plays its home games at Osceola County Stadium.

The club played in multiple leagues, beginning with the United Soccer League, the second tier of the US soccer pyramid in 2016 and 2017, before electing to forgo the 2018 season and join the newly formed third division, USL League One, in its inaugural 2019 season. After another season on hiatus in 2021, the team became an inaugural member of MLS Next Pro.

History

United Soccer League
On June 30, 2015, Orlando City SC announced that they would operate a USL club starting in 2016 in the Central Florida area. The team would be their direct USL affiliate, and Orlando City and Louisville City (their USL affiliate club for 2015) had negotiated a "long-term formal partnership" to replace their affiliation arrangement.

Orlando City also announced that Anthony Pulis would coach the new team. Pulis was a player for Orlando City SC's USL club from 2011 to 2014 and is the son of Tony Pulis, manager of numerous English Premier League sides. On August 11, 2015, Arizona United announced that Rob Valentino would retire from playing to take the assistant coach role for Orlando's new USL team.

On October 15, 2015, the club was officially branded Orlando City B, with home games to be played in Melbourne at the Titan Soccer Complex on the campus of  Eastern Florida State College.  In addition, OCB announced its first ever player signings: defenders Mikey Ambrose and Kyle Callan-McFadden, and midfielder Tony Rocha.

On August 12, 2016, in a game against New York Red Bulls II, Orlando City B participated in the first competitive match in North America to employ Video Assistant Referee technology. They finished their debut season 8th in the Eastern Conference, the final qualifying spot for playoffs. They lost in the Conference Quarterfinal to New York Red Bulls II 4–0.

In November 2016 it was announced that OCB would be moving to the newly opened Orlando City Stadium in time for the 2017 season. The team finished the season in 9th place, two points short of the playoffs, but finished one place higher in the overall standings than their debut season.

On January 12, 2018, the organization declared its intention to forgo the 2018 season as they continued to assess their minor league participation, a move that had looked likely by this point with OCB only having one player under contract and lacking a manager following Anthony Pulis' departure for Saint Louis FC in November.

USL League One
In June 2018, the club announced it was to become a founding member of USL's new third tier league, USL League One, scheduled to begin play in 2019. It was hoped the move would lead OCB to better act as an upward transitional stepping-stone between Orlando City's Development Academy and the senior MLS team. On October 3, 2018, Fernando De Argila was announced as head coach. He had previously been head coach and director of methodology at the Soccer Institute at Montverde Academy. After winning only three of the opening 19 games, De Argila was sacked in July 2019. Roberto Sibaja acted as interim head coach from the rest of the season as the team finished in last place.

In May 2019, the team announced plans to relocate OCB as part of a wider vision to house all of Orlando City's development pyramid at the same location for the first time, creating a 20-acre training complex at Osceola Heritage Park to house the senior MLS team, OCB and Development Academy. Orlando City B will play their matches at the new site starting in the 2020 season following the departure of minor league baseball team Florida Fire Frogs. Ahead of the season it was announced Orlando City Academy Director Marcelo Neveleff would be the team's new head coach.

In October 2020, the team announced it was withdrawing from USL1 at the end of the season with a possibility of an MLS reserve league launching in 2021.

MLS Next Pro
After spending the 2021 season on hiatus, the club announced on December 6, 2021, that it was joining the inaugural 21-team MLS Next Pro season starting in 2022.

Location 
Tim Holt, Orlando's vice president of development, said that they would be looking for a stadium in Central Florida in order to facilitate the training of emerging players with the MLS team. Holt was the president of USL until May 2015. Eastern Florida State College's stadium was visited by team personnel as a possible location.

On August 21, 2015, the VP for athletics at Eastern Florida State College claimed in a pitch to the Brevard County Tourist Development Council's Sports Commission that the college's Titan Soccer Complex and a stadium in Deland were among the finalists to host games for the USL team.  Said plan was approved and the Titan Sports Complex at ECSC was OCB's official home venue for the 2016 season.

For the 2017 season in the USL, Orlando City B moved to Orlando City's newly built home stadium, Orlando City Stadium.

For the 2019 season in USL League One, the team moved to Montverde Academy.

In 2020, as part of a club-wide move, the team relocated again, this time to the new Orlando City training facility at Osceola Heritage Park alongside both the senior MLS team and Development Academy. Matches are played at the complex's newly converted 5,400 seat Osceola County Stadium.

Players and staff

Roster

Staff

Year-by-year

Head coaches
 Only competitive games counted. Includes USL regular season and playoffs.

References

External links
 

 
Association football clubs established in 2015
Soccer clubs in Florida
Former USL Championship teams
Orlando City SC
Sports in Brevard County, Florida
2015 establishments in Florida
Reserve soccer teams in the United States
Lake County, Florida
Former USL League One teams
MLS Next Pro teams
Sports in Kissimmee, Florida